The 1987 Australian Touring Car Championship was a motor racing competition which was open to Touring Cars complying with regulations as defined by the Confederation of Australian Motor Sport and based on FIA Group A rules. The championship, which was the 28th Australian Touring Car Championship, began on 1 March 1987 at Calder Park Raceway and ended on 5 July at Oran Park Raceway after nine rounds. The Calder round saw the world debut of the racing versions of the BMW M3, the Ford Sierra RS Cosworth and the Alfa Romeo 75 Turbo.

After years of racing for very little in prize money which brought numerous complaints from the leading competitors (in 1984, Dick Johnson Racing (DJR) had travelled an estimated 20,000 km to races around the country from their Brisbane base, often for as little as A$1,200 in prize money, far less money that was on offer at the time for the lower ranked Group E Series Production "Super Series" which offered a total prize pool of $200,000 thanks to series sponsor Bob Jane T-Marts), CAMS signed a AU$275,000 sponsorship package with Shell which brought the championship an overall sponsor for the first time and saw the series promoted as the Shell Ultra Australian Touring Car Championship.

Shell would also become the major sponsor of DJR which saw the team expand to running two cars for the first time. The team ran a pair of the new Ford Sierra RS Cosworths for team boss Dick Johnson and his 1986 James Hardie 1000 co-driver Gregg Hansford. Dick Johnson's win in Round 5 at the Adelaide International Raceway was the world's first race victory for the Sierra RS Cosworth and was also Dick's first ATCC win since Round 4 of the 1984 ATCC at Surfers Paradise.

The 1987 ATCC was the first time since 1975 that Peter Brock failed to win a round of the championship, his best finish being a 3rd at Symmons Plains in Tasmania in Round 2 where his 4.9L V8 Holden VK Commodore SS Group A was simply out-gunned on a noted power circuit by the Roadways Racing Commodore of Allan Grice (before his race ended), the factory Nissan Skyline turbo of race winner George Fury, while his heavy Commodore was no match on tyres and brakes for the 4 cyl, 2.3L BMW M3 of Jim Richards. Brock did manage to hold second behind runaway early leader Grice for a number of laps, but once Fury was through the Skyline drove away from Brock and he then had no answer to the challenge of Richards.

The 1987 championship was also the first time since 1972 that a Holden car failed to win a round of the ATCC, the best result being a second by Larry Perkins in the opening round at Calder.

The 1987 ATCC was also the first time in championship history that rolling starts were used. Rolling starts were used at Calder for Round 1 and at Adelaide for Round 5.

Jim Richards victory in the final round of the series at Oran Park would be the last time a car powered by a naturally aspirated engine would win an ATCC race until Tony Longhurst won Round 6 of the 1991 Australian Touring Car Championship driving a BMW M3 Evolution. Between 1988 and Round 6 in 1991, turbo powered cars would win 30 straight ATCC races, 21 of them by the Sierra Cosworth's evolution replacement which appeared after the 1987 ATCC, the Ford Sierra RS500.

1987 was a year of lasts in Australian touring car racing. It was the last time Peter Brock would drive a Holden until 1991 as he would switch first to BMW in 1988 and then Fords in 1989 and 1990. Consequently, it was the last time the Holden Dealer Team name, which started under Harry Firth in 1969, would be used, though the team officially ran as "HDT Racing Pty Ltd" as it was no longer the factory backed team following Holden's well publicised split with Brock in February only one week before the opening round at Calder. Prior to Calder, Holden had formed the Holden Motorsport Group and immediately signed Larry Perkins and his team as well as Allan Grice and Roadways Racing to be the 'factory backed' teams in the championship, though Grice would later say that it was more about moral support and an easier supply of parts rather than any financial support. It would also be Colin Bond's last year of racing Alfa Romeo's before switching back to Ford to run a Sierra RS500 from 1988 (largely due to Alfa stopping its development program of the Alfa 75 touring car and because Bond felt that he needed an outright car to do justice to his sponsor Caltex). It was also the last time the JPS Team BMW (who won their second title) would be seen with team boss Frank Gardner unexpectedly closing the team down at the end of the year.

Teams and drivers
The following teams and drivers competed in the 1987 Australian Touring Car Championship.

Peter Brock drove both the #05 and #6 HDT VK Commodore during the season

Race calendar
The 1987 Australian Touring Car Championship was contested over a nine-round series with one race per round.

Classes
Cars competed in two classes based on engine capacity.
 Over 2500cc
 Under 2500cc

The Over 2500cc class was contested by Ford Mustang, Ford Sierra, Holden Commodore, Nissan Skyline, Rover Vitesse and Toyota Supra.

The Under 2500cc class consisted of Alfa Romeo 75, BMW 323i, BMW M3, Isuzu Gemini, Nissan Gazelle, Toyota Celica and Toyota Corolla.

Points system
Championship points were awarded at each round on a 20–15–12–10–8–6–4–3–2–1 basis for the top ten positions outright and on a 9-6-4-3-2-1 basis for the top six positions in each of the two classes. Only the best eight round results could be retained by each driver.

Championship results

See also
 1987 Australian Manufacturers' Championship, which was contested concurrently with the 1987 Australian Touring Car Championship
 1987 Australian 2.0 Litre Touring Car Championship
 1987 Australian Touring Car season

References

External links
 Official V8 Supercar site Contains historical ATCC information.
 1987 Australian Touring Car racing images at www.autopics.com.au

Australian Touring Car Championship seasons
Touring Cars